Innocent Nshuti (born 31 January 1998), is a Rwandan footballer who currently plays as a forward for A.P.R.

Career statistics

Club

Notes

International

International goals
Scores and results list Rwanda's goal tally first.

References

External links
Innocent Nshuti at Footballdatabase

1998 births
Living people
Rwandan footballers
Rwanda international footballers
Rwandan expatriate footballers
Association football forwards
APR F.C. players
Stade Tunisien players
Tunisian Ligue Professionnelle 1 players
Rwandan expatriate sportspeople in Tunisia
Expatriate footballers in Tunisia
2018 African Nations Championship players
Rwanda A' international footballers